Zəngələ (also, Zangyala and Zangyalya) is a village in the Yardymli Rayon of Azerbaijan.  The village forms part of the municipality of Vərov.

References

External links

Populated places in Yardimli District